Jualo.com is an Indonesian e-classifieds website which allows users to obtain or provide goods and services. Payment is through an escrow system.

History 
Jualo.com was founded by Chaim Fetter in 2014. At that time, he had only 15 staff members, including web developers. The initial team was composed of five people. It offered escrow payments, geo-search, and home delivery 3PL integrations.

In early 2016, the company had millions of monthly visitors and hundreds of thousands of new monthly products and public listings. Jualo.com attracted Series A investment from NSI Ventures (based in Singapore) and Susquehanna International Group. Incumbent investors include Indonesia-based VCs Alpha JWC Ventures and Mountain Kejora.

In April 2017, João Pedro Principe, who had joined Jualo.com in June 2016, took over as CEO.

Jualo.com holds a close relationship with the non-profit organization Yayasan Peduli Anak (YPA) since the two share a founder. Jualo.com provides operational support in Jakarta to YPA, which operates primarily in Lombok and Sumbawa.

In 2018, Jualo.com had 4 million monthly active users and facilitated transactions worth $1 billion. The same year the company was acquired by Carro.

In March 2020, Manisha Seewal became the CEO of Jualo.com.

References 

 Online marketplaces of Indonesia
 Indonesian brands